Conan the Destroyer is a 1984 American epic sword and sorcery film directed by Richard Fleischer from a screenplay by Stanley Mann and a story by Roy Thomas and Gerry Conway. Based on the character Conan the Barbarian created by Robert E. Howard, it is the sequel to Conan the Barbarian (1982). The film stars Arnold Schwarzenegger and Mako reprising their roles as Conan and Akiro, the Wizard of the Mounds, respectively. The cast also includes Grace Jones, Wilt Chamberlain, Tracey Walter, and Olivia d'Abo.

Conan the Destroyer was theatrically released in the United States on June 29, 1984, by Universal Pictures. Upon release, the film received generally mixed reviews from critics. It grossed between $26.4 million and $31 million in the United States.

Plot
Conan and his companion, the thief Malak, are confronted by Queen Taramis of Shadizar, who tests their combat ability with several of her guards. Satisfied, she tells Conan that she has a quest for him. He refuses her, but when she promises to resurrect his lost love, Valeria, Conan agrees to the quest. He is to escort the Queen's niece, Princess Jehnna, a virgin, who is destined to restore the jeweled horn of the dreaming god Dagoth. The magic gem Heart of Ahriman must first be retrieved, in order to locate the horn. Conan and Malak are joined by Bombaata, the captain of Taramis's guard. Bombaata has secret orders to kill Conan once the gem is obtained.

The gem is secured in the fortress of a powerful wizard, so Conan seeks the help of his friend Akiro, the Wizard of the Mounds, who must first be rescued from a tribe of cannibals who have captured him. The adventurers encounter Zula, a powerful bandit warrior being tortured by vengeful villagers. Freeing Zula at Jehnna's request, Conan accepts the indebted warrior's offer to join their quest.

The adventurers travel to the castle of Thoth-Amon, where the gem is located. As they sleep by the lake surrounding the castle, the wizard takes the form of a giant bird and kidnaps Jehnna. In the morning Akiro divines this and also divines a hidden entrance to the castle through a water gate. As they search for Jehnna, Conan is separated from the group, and the others are forced to watch him battle a fierce man-beast in a hall of mirrors. By breaking the mirrors Conan mortally wounds the creature which is revealed as a polymorphed Thoth-Amon. With the wizard's death, the castle begins to disintegrate, forcing the group's hasty retreat. They are ambushed by Taramis's guards, but drive them off. Bombaata feigns ignorance about the attack. The gem reveals where the jeweled horn is. Jehnna expresses romantic interest in Conan, but he rebuffs her and declares his devotion to Valeria.

They reach an ancient temple, where the horn is secured. Jehnna obtains it while Akiro deciphers engravings. He learns that Jehnna will be ritually sacrificed to awaken Dagoth. They are attacked by the priests guarding the horn. A secret exit is revealed, but Bombaata blocks the others' escape and seizes Jehnna. Despite this treachery, Conan and his allies escape from the priests and trek to Shadizar to rescue Jehnna.

Malak shows them a secret route to the throne room. Conan confronts Bombaata and kills him in combat. Zula impales the Grand Vizier before he can sacrifice Jehnna. The rising Dagoth becomes distorted from a human statue into a monstrous entity. He kills Taramis, then attacks Conan. Zula and Malak join the fight, but Dagoth effortlessly sweeps them aside. Akiro tells Conan that the horn is the Monster's life, so he rips it out, then finishes him off. 

The newly crowned Queen Jehnna offers each of her companions a place in her new court: Zula will be the new captain of the guard, Akiro the queen's advisor, and Malak the court jester. Jehnna offers Conan marriage and the opportunity to rule the kingdom with her as her King, but he declines and departs to find further adventures and his own place in the world... but that is another story.

Cast

 Arnold Schwarzenegger as Conan the Destroyer
 Grace Jones as Zula
 Wilt Chamberlain as Bombaata
 Mako as Akiro
 Tracey Walter as Malak
 Sarah Douglas as Queen Taramis
 Olivia d'Abo as Princess Jehnna
 Pat Roach as Thoth-Amon
 Jeff Corey as Grand Vizier
 Sven-Ole Thorsen as Togra
 André the Giant as the Dagoth monster (uncredited)
 Ferdy Mayne as The Leader

Production

Toning down the violence
When John Milius, director of Conan the Barbarian, was unavailable, Dino De Laurentiis suggested Richard Fleischer to his daughter Raffaella De Laurentiis, who was producing Conan the Destroyer. Fleischer had already made Barabbas (1961) and Mandingo (1975) for Dino De Laurentiis.

Conan the Barbarian made about $40 million at the U.S. box office when it was released in 1982 with an R-rating, and an additional $50 million in other markets. Because Universal Pictures and producer Dino De Laurentiis thought it would have been even more successful if it had been less violent, they wanted to tone down the violence in the sequel. Conan the Destroyer originally received an R-rating like its predecessor, but the film was recut to secure a PG-rating. Fleischer delivered a movie that was less violent (and somewhat more humorous) than the first, although some scenes of violence have bloody results (the PG-13 rating did not exist until July 1 of that same year). Carlo Rambaldi created the Dagoth monster.

Casting
Arnold Schwarzenegger and Mako Iwamatsu, who played the Wizard of the Mound and narrator in the first film, return for the second film, while Mako's character is now named Akiro. Sven-Ole Thorsen, who played Thorgrim in the first film, also returned, but this time he had to partially cover his face with a mask, as he was playing a different character. Singer Grace Jones played the warrior Zula, the last of her tribe. This was the basketball player Wilt Chamberlain's only film role and the debut of Olivia d'Abo, who played the petulant teenaged princess. David Lander was originally cast to play the foolish thief Malak, but due to his deteriorating health from the onset of multiple sclerosis, he was forced to quit the project, and the part was recast with Tracey Walter. Professional wrestler Pat Roach, who memorably played the German Mechanic in Raiders of the Lost Ark and the Thuggee Overseer in Indiana Jones and the Temple of Doom, was cast as crystal palace Man Ape/sorcerer Toth-Amon. André the Giant had an uncredited role as the Dagoth monster.

Photography
Conan the Destroyer was the fourth film on which British director of photography Jack Cardiff worked with Fleischer. Cardiff had already photographed The Vikings (1958), Crossed Swords (1977), and Amityville 3-D (1983) for the director. They worked together twice more on Million Dollar Mystery (1987), and Fleischer's last film, the short Call from Space (1989), which was shot in the 65-mm Showscan process. Cardiff's other notable films include John Huston's The African Queen (1951), King Vidor's War and Peace (1956), and Rambo: First Blood Part II (1985).

Filming
Shooting took place in Mexico City from November 1, 1983, to February 10, 1984.

Deleted scenes
In the film, a camel is knocked to the ground, and after struggling to get back up, its hind legs are drawn forward with wires so that it is forced to sit down before falling to the ground. This sequence is cut from the U.K. version, although a later scene in which Conan apologizes to the camel is left in. Also cut is a double horse-fall in the opening battle. To secure a PG rating, Sarah Douglas said several scenes involving her character were cut, including a sex scene with Schwarzenegger, slapping Chamberlain, a virgin sacrifice, and the seduction of a statue.

Music

The musical score of Conan The Destroyer was composed, conducted, and produced by Basil Poledouris, and it was performed by the orchestra Unione Musicisti Di Roma.

Reception

Box office
Conan the Destroyer grossed $31 million in the U.S. Schwarzenegger, Fleischer, and De Laurentiis subsequently teamed up again to make Red Sonja a year later. The film, jointly with Bolero, was nominated for two Razzie Awards, including Worst Supporting Actress and won Worst New Star for D'Abo during the 5th Golden Raspberry Awards.

Critical response
Roger Ebert rated the film 3 out of 4 stars and wrote that Conan the Destroyer is "sillier, funnier, and more entertaining" than the first film. In praising the film's use of character actors, Ebert singled out Jones, who he said brings rock star charisma to her role. Variety called it "the ideal sword and sorcery picture" and also praised Jones. Vincent Canby of The New York Times wrote that Schwarzenegger struggles with the film's more comedic tone.

Colin Greenland reviewed Conan the Destroyer for Imagine magazine, and stated that "Apart from the fact that it is acted by real people, Conan the Destroyer is pure comicbook, which has the odd effect of making the actual animated comicbook largely superfluous."

Rotten Tomatoes, which collects both contemporary and modern reviews, reports that 27% of 26 surveyed critics gave the film a positive review; the average rating is 4.4/10. The site's consensus states: "Conan the Destroyer softens the edges that gave its predecessor gravitas, resulting in a campy sequel without the comparative thrills." At Metacritic the film received a score of 53 out of 100, based on 12 reviews, indicating "mixed or average" reviews.

Other media

Comic books and graphic novel
Marvel Comics published a comic-book adaptation of the film by writer Michael Fleisher and artist John Buscema in Marvel Super Special #35 (Dec. 1984). The adaptation was also available as a two-issue limited series.

Roy Thomas and Gerry Conway wrote the original story treatment but were dissastified with the final screenplay by Stanley Mann and the finished film. They made their story into the graphic novel Conan the Barbarian: The Horn of Azoth, published in 1990, with art by Mike Docherty. The names of the characters were changed to distance the graphic novel from the movie: Dagoth became Azoth, Jehnna became Natari, Zula became Shumballa, Bombaata became Strabo, Thoth-Amon became Rammon, and the characters of Queen Taramis and The Leader were combined into sorcerer Karanthes, father of Natari.

Novelization
Robert Jordan wrote a novelization of the film in 1984 for Tor Books.

Sequel
The third film in the Conan trilogy had been planned for a 1987 release with the title Conan the Conqueror. The director was to have been either Guy Hamilton or John Guillermin. Arnold Schwarzenegger was committed to the film Predator, and De Laurentiis's contract with the star had expired after his obligation to Red Sonja (his role in which was originally intended to be Conan) and Raw Deal, and he was not keen to negotiate a new one. The third Conan film fell into development hell, the script eventually being turned into Kull the Conqueror.

In October 2012, Universal Pictures announced plans for Schwarzenegger to return to the role of Conan for the film The Legend of Conan. The planned story was a direct sequel to the original film, "bypassing" Conan the Destroyer and the 2011 film starring Jason Momoa.  In the years following the announcement, Will Beall, Andrea Berloff, and producer Chris Morgan worked on the script, and Schwarzenegger expressed enthusiasm for the project, affirming plans to star in the film.  However, in April 2017, Morgan stated that Universal had dropped the project, but that there remains a possibility of a television series. In October 2019, Arnold Schwarzenegger confirmed that the film was still in active development, now called Conan the King.

In popular culture
Kim Wayans' spoof portrayals of Grace Jones on the show In Living Color are based on Grace's performance of Zula in Conan the Destroyer. In 1985, Australian heavy metal music group Prowler changed its name to Taramis after the character from the film.

See also
 List of American films of 1984
Arnold Schwarzenegger filmography

References

External links

 
 
 
 
 
 

1984 films
1980s action adventure films
1980s fantasy adventure films
American action adventure films
American fantasy adventure films
1980s fantasy action films
American sequel films
American sword and sorcery films
Conan the Barbarian films
Films about witchcraft
Universal Pictures films
Films produced by Raffaella De Laurentiis
Films scored by Basil Poledouris
Films shot in Mexico City
Films based on works by Robert E. Howard
Films directed by Richard Fleischer
Films set in castles
Films with screenplays by Stanley Mann
Films with screenplays by Roy Thomas
Golden Raspberry Award winning films
Films with screenplays by Gerry Conway
1980s English-language films
1980s American films